Miguel Martínez Peñaloza (born 12 August 1977) is a Mexican politician from the National Action Party. From 2009 to 2012 he served as Deputy of the LXI Legislature of the Mexican Congress representing Querétaro. He also served as municipal president of Cadereyta de Montes and as a local deputy in the Congress of Querétaro.

References

1977 births
Living people
Politicians from Querétaro
National Action Party (Mexico) politicians
21st-century Mexican politicians
Universidad del Valle de México alumni
Members of the Congress of Querétaro
Municipal presidents in Querétaro
Deputies of the LXI Legislature of Mexico
Members of the Chamber of Deputies (Mexico) for Querétaro